was a Japanese football player. He played for Japan national team.

Club career
Wakabayashi was born in Hyogo Prefecture on 29 August 1907. He played for  his local club Kobe Icchu Club was consisted of his alma mater high school players and graduates. At the club, he won 1927 Emperor's Cup with Tadao Takayama and so on.

National team career
In May 1930, when Wakabayashi was a Tokyo Imperial University student, he was selected Japan national team for 1930 Far Eastern Championship Games in Tokyo and Japan also won the championship. At this competition, on 25 May, he debuted and scored 4 goals against Philippines. He was the first player in Japan national team to score a hat-trick in debut. The same feat would be achieved 80 years later by Sota Hirayama. On 29 May, he also played against Republic of China. He played 2 games and scored 4 goals for Japan in 1930.

On 7 August 1937, Wakabayashi died of lung disease in Hyogo Prefecture at the age of 29.

National team statistics

References

External links
 
 Japan National Football Team Database

1907 births
1937 deaths
University of Tokyo alumni
Association football people from Hyōgo Prefecture
Japanese footballers
Japan international footballers
Association football forwards
Deaths from lung disease